The State Alcohol and Tobacco Company of Iceland (ÁTVR) is a state owned company that is the sole legal retail vendor of alcohol in Iceland. It runs a chain of 51 retail stores named Vínbúðin (the wine shop), known colloquially as Ríkið (The State). In addition it distributes tobacco to other retailers and assesses and collects tobacco tax.

Iceland has very high taxes on alcohol to curtail consumption and as a government revenue source. Tax rates are proportionate to the alcohol content.

The state run company is under the Ministry of Finance.

See also
Alcohol monopoly
Prohibition in Iceland
Beer in Iceland

References

External links
 Vínbúðin's website

Alcohol monopolies
Food and drink companies of Iceland
Tobacco in Iceland
Alcohol in Iceland
Retail companies established in 1961
1961 establishments in Iceland
Government agencies of Iceland